George Beresford may refer to:

George Beresford, 1st Marquess of Waterford (1735–1800), Irish peer
George Beresford (bishop) (1765–1841), Bishop of Kilmore and Ardagh, nephew of the above
George Beresford (provost of Tuam) (died 1842), Provost of Tuam, 1816–1842, nephew of the Marquess of Waterford
Lord George Beresford (1781–1839), British politician, son of the Marquess of Waterford
Sir George de la Poer Beresford, 2nd Baronet (1811–1873), MP for Athlone, 1841–1842, grandson of the Marquess of Waterford
George Beresford (Armagh MP) (1831–1906), MP for Armagh, grandson of the bishop
George Charles Beresford (1864–1938), British studio photographer, great-grandson of the bishop

See also
Sir George Beresford Craddock (1898–1976), British Conservative politician